Sulo Nurmela (13 February 1908 – 13 August 1999) was a Finnish cross-country skier. He won a gold medal at the 1936 Winter Olympics in the 4 × 10 km relay and served as the Finnish flag bearer at those games.

Nurmela won two world titles in 1934: in the individual 18 km and 4 × 10 km relay events. While traveling to Czechoslovakia to the next world championships he became ill with a high fever and had to withdraw from his individual races. Yet he felt obliged to compete in the relay, as Finland sent only four skiers, and there was no substitute. His first three teammates gained a two-minute lead, and Nurmela managed to finish more than a minute ahead of the competitors and win his third world title.

Nurmela won three races in the Lahti Ski Games: 17 km in 1934 and 1937 and 50 km in 1937. He retired after placing eighth over 50 km at the 1938 World Championships. He worked as a farmer most of his life.

Cross-country skiing results
All results are sourced from the International Ski Federation (FIS).

Olympic Games
 1 medal – (1 gold)

World Championships
 3 medals – (3 gold)

References

External links

1908 births
1999 deaths
People from Miehikkälä
People from Viipuri Province (Grand Duchy of Finland)
Finnish male cross-country skiers
Cross-country skiers at the 1936 Winter Olympics
Olympic medalists in cross-country skiing
FIS Nordic World Ski Championships medalists in cross-country skiing
Medalists at the 1936 Winter Olympics
Olympic gold medalists for Finland
Sportspeople from Kymenlaakso
20th-century Finnish people